The 2022 Speedway Grand Prix season was the 28th season of the Speedway Grand Prix era, and decided the 77th FIM Speedway World Championship. It was the first series promoted by Discovery Sports Events.

Artem Laguta was the reigning champion, having won the 2021 title. However, due to the invasion of Ukraine by Russia, he and Emil Sayfutdinov did not return as all Russian and Belarusian riders had been suspended and were barred from participating any FIM-sanctioned events.

Bartosz Zmarzlik won the championship, claiming a third world title. Leon Madsen finished as runner-up, with Maciej Janowski taking the last spot on the podium.

Qualification 
For the 2022 season there were 15 permanent riders, who were joined at each Grand Prix by one wild card and two track reserves.

The top six riders from the 2021 championship qualified automatically. These riders were joined by the three riders who qualified via the Grand Prix Challenge, and the 2021 Speedway European Championship winner.

The final five riders were nominated by series promoters, Discovery Sports Events, following the completion of the 2021 season.

Following the Russian invasion of Ukraine, Discovery Sports Events made the decision to suspend Artem Laguta and Emil Sayfutdinov in line with the FIM's ban on Russian riders. They were replaced in the line-up by Jack Holder and Dan Bewley.

Qualified riders

Qualified substitutes 
The following riders were nominated as substitutes:

Calendar
The 2022 season consisted of 10 events.

Final Classification

See also
 2022 Individual Long Track World Championship
 2022 Speedway of Nations

References

External links 
 Speedway World Championships

2022
Grand Prix
 
Sports events affected by the 2022 Russian invasion of Ukraine